"Kiss Kiss Kiss" is the second single by the artist BENI (formerly known as Beni Arashiro) under the label Universal Japan. The song was the theme song for the Kao Biore Body Deli CM it also was the theme song for Recochoku. The song is described as a youthful love song.

The single peaked at number 40 on the Oricon charts and hit the #1 spot on the Chaku Uta Full chart for six days. The single was ranked #1 on the weekly Chaku Uta chart.

Track listing 
 Kiss Kiss Kiss
 Signal
 Mou Nido To… DJ HASEBE REMIX
 Kiss Kiss Kiss (Instrumental)

Chart Rankings

Oricon Charts (Japan)

Various charts

References

Songs about kissing
2009 singles
Beni (singer) songs
RIAJ Digital Track Chart number-one singles
2009 songs